George B. Hutchinson is a noted American scholar, Professor of Literatures in English and Newton C. Farr Professor of American Culture at Cornell University, where he is also Director of the John S. Knight Institute for Writing in the Disciplines. He has held a fellowship from the Atkinson Center for a Sustainable Future since 2016.

Life 
Hutchinson was raised in Indianapolis.  He graduated from Brown University with an A.B. in American Civilization in 1975. At Brown, he won a silver medal in the Intercollegiate Rowing Association championships in 1973 and served as captain and stroke of the men's varsity crew in 1974–5. He served in the Peace Corps in Burkina Faso from 1975 to 1977, organizing well-digging projects by hand, for water, in rural villages. He graduated from Indiana University with an M.A. in English in 1980 and a Ph.D. in English and American Studies in 1983.

He taught at the University of Tennessee from 1982-2000, chairing the American Studies Program from 1987-2000 and the English department from 1999-2000. During this time, he was President of the Knoxville Rowing Association and played a vital role in establishing the university's first-ever varsity women's crew.  He was Visiting Professor of North American Studies at the University of Bonn in 1993-4 and 1998. From 2000 to 2012, Professor Hutchinson was the Booth Tarkington Professor of Literary Studies at Indiana University Bloomington, where he chaired the English department 
.  He was nominated for a Pulitzer Prize in History in 2006 for his book, The Harlem Renaissance in Black and White, which was also a finalist for the Rea Non-Fiction Prize of the Boston Book Review in 1996.  Following a lecture given by Professor Hutchinson at the Hutchins Center for African and African American Research in 2021, twenty-five years after The Harlem Renaissance in Black and White was initially published by Harvard University Press, the Afro-American scholar Henry Louis Gates Jr. notably acknowledged the status of Hutchinson's book as "the bible on the Harlem Renaissance".

Since 2013, Hutchinson has researched and taught nineteenth- and twentieth-century American literature and culture at Cornell University in Ithaca, New York, focusing particularly on critical questions around race and ecology.  He is currently working on ecologies of literary emergence in the American Renaissance, a well-digger's memoir set in the village of Zéguedéguin, Burkina Faso, and how to read Leaves of Grass.

Awards 
Hutchinson was 1988 and 1989 National Endowment for the Humanities Fellow. He was also a 2011 Guggenheim Fellow.
His book In Search of Nella Larsen, a groundbreaking biography of the author long referred to by scholars as "the mystery woman of the Harlem Renaissance,"  won the Christian Gauss Award of Phi Beta Kappa and was listed by The Washington Post and Booklist as one of the best Nonfiction books of 2006. It was also selected as an Editors' Choice by the New York Times Book Review and as an Outstanding Academic Title by Choice magazine.

His book Facing the Abyss:  American Literature and Culture in the 1940s was shortlisted for the Christian Gauss Award in 2019 and won Honorable Mention for the Matei Călinescu Prize of the Modern Language Association, for distinguished scholarship on 20th and 21st century literature and thought.  His edition of Jean Toomer's Cane (novel), published by Penguin Classics in 2019, was an Editors' Choice of the New York Times Book Review.

Works

Authored

Edited

with John K. Young, 

by Anita Thompson Dickinson Reynolds and Howard Miller. 
by Jean Toomer. Cane, Penguin Books, 2019.

References

See also
Nella Larsen
Ethnic Studies
Biographical criticism
African American culture

Indiana University faculty
Brown University alumni
Peace Corps volunteers
Indiana University alumni
University of Tennessee faculty
Academic staff of the University of Bonn
Living people
1953 births